Downlands is a residential locality in the local government area (LGA) of Burnie in the North-west and west LGA region of Tasmania. The 2016 census recorded a population of 240 for the state suburb of Downlands.
It is a small suburb of the Burnie in north-west Tasmania.

McKenna Park Regional Hockey Complex Inc caters for hockey on astro turf and cricket on grass grounds. McKenna Park also has a function centre.

The City Marians Hockey Club and South Burnie Hockey Club play out of the McKenna Park Regional Hockey Complex in the Burnie District Hockey Association.

History 
Downlands is a confirmed locality.

Geography
All boundaries are survey lines.

Road infrastructure
Route B18 (Mount Street) runs along the eastern boundary.

References

External links 
 City Marians Hockey Club
 South Burnie Hockey Club

Suburbs of Burnie, Tasmania